Norway participated in the Eurovision Song Contest 2019. The Norwegian broadcaster  (NRK) organised the national final  2019 in order to select the Norwegian entry for the 2019 contest in Tel Aviv, Israel.

The winning song of the  2019 was Spirit in the Sky by Keiino. In the final of the Eurovision Song Contest 2019, Norway won the televote with 291 points, but received only 40 points from the juries, overall finishing in 6th place.

Background

Norway had won the contest on three occasions: in 1985 with the song "" performed by Bobbysocks!, in 1995 with the song "Nocturne" performed by Secret Garden, and in 2009 with the song "Fairytale" performed by Alexander Rybak. Norway also had the two dubious distinctions of having finished last in the Eurovision final more than any other country and for having the most "nul points" (zero points) in the contest, the latter being a record the nation shared together with Austria. The country had finished last eleven times and had failed to score a point during four contests. In 2018, Norway was represented by Rybak for the second time, with the song "That's How You Write a Song". The country placed 15th in the final with 144 points.

The Norwegian national broadcaster,  (NRK), broadcasts the event within Norway and organises the selection process for the nation's entry. The broadcaster has traditionally organised the national final , which has selected the Norwegian entry for the Eurovision Song Contest in all but one of their participations.

Before Eurovision

Melodi Grand Prix 2019
 2019 was the 57th edition of the Norwegian national final  and selected Norway's entry for the Eurovision Song Contest 2019. The show took place on 2 March 2019 at the Oslo Spektrum in Oslo, hosted by Heidi Ruud Ellingsen and Kåre Magnus Bergh. The show was televised on NRK1, NRK TV, broadcast via radio with commentary by Ole Christian Øen on NRK P1 as well as streamed online at NRK's official website nrk.no. The national final was watched by 961,000 viewers in Norway with a market share of 68.6%.

Competing entries
A submission period was opened by NRK between 31 January 2018 and 9 September 2018. Songwriters of any nationality were allowed to submit entries, while performers of the selected songs would be chosen by NRK in consultation with the songwriters. In addition to the public call for submissions, NRK reserved the right to directly invite certain artists and composers to compete. Project leader Stig Karlsen stated that he wanted a participatory field with "celebrities and artists that people know" in the competition, and that NRK would "do an even bigger job to bring forth some new talents as well", making  2019 "the largest MGP final". At the close of the deadline, over 1,000 submissions were received. Ten songs were selected for the competition by various focus groups and the competing acts and songs were revealed on 25 January 2019 during a press conference at NRK's Store Studio, presented by Heidi Ruud Ellingsen and Kåre Magnus Bergh and broadcast via NRK1 and online at mgp.no. Among the competing artists was former Eurovision Song Contest entrant Mørland, who represented Norway in 2015 with Debrah Scarlett. At least two of the artists: Chris Medina and D'Sound were directly invited by NRK to participate in the national final. The competing entries were later premiered after the press conference.

Final
Ten songs competed during the final on 2 March 2019. The winner was selected over three rounds of voting. In the first round, the top four entries were selected by a 50/50 combination of public televoting and ten international juries to proceed to the second round, the Gold Final. The viewers and the juries each had a total of 580 points to award. Each jury group distributed their points as follows: 1–8, 10 and 12 points. The public vote was based on the percentage of votes each song achieved. For example, if a song gained 10% of the viewer vote, then that entry would be awarded 10% of 580 points rounded to the nearest integer: 58 points. In the Gold Final, the top two entries were selected solely by the public televote to proceed to the third round, the Gold Duel. In the Gold Duel, the results of the public televote were aggregated to the results from the Gold Final and led to the victory of "Spirit in the Sky" performed by Keiino with 231,937 votes.

At Eurovision
According to Eurovision rules, all nations with the exceptions of the host country and the "Big Five" (France, Germany, Italy, Spain and the United Kingdom) are required to qualify from one of two semi-finals in order to compete for the final; the top ten countries from each semi-final progress to the final. The European Broadcasting Union (EBU) split up the competing countries into six different pots based on voting patterns from previous contests, with countries with favourable voting histories put into the same pot. On 28 January 2019, a special allocation draw was held which placed each country into one of the two semi-finals, as well as which half of the show they would perform in. Norway was placed into the second semi-final, to be held on 16 May 2019, and was scheduled to perform in the second half of the show.

Once all the competing songs for the 2019 contest had been released, the running order for the semi-finals was decided by the shows' producers rather than through another draw, so that similar songs were not placed next to each other. Norway was set to perform in position 15, following the entry from Albania and preceding the entry from the Netherlands.

Semi-final
Norway performed fifteenth in the second semi-final, following the entry from Albania and preceding the entry from the Netherlands. At the end of the show, Norway was announced as having finished in the top 10 and subsequently qualifying for the grand final. It was later revealed that Norway placed seventh in the semi-final, receiving a total of 210 points: 170 points from the televoting and 40 points from the juries.

Voting
Voting during the three shows involved each country awarding two sets of points from 1-8, 10 and 12: one from their professional jury and the other from televoting. Each nation's jury consisted of five music industry professionals who are citizens of the country they represent, with their names published before the contest to ensure transparency. This jury judged each entry based on: vocal capacity; the stage performance; the song's composition and originality; and the overall impression by the act. In addition, no member of a national jury was permitted to be related in any way to any of the competing acts in such a way that they cannot vote impartially and independently. The individual rankings of each jury member as well as the nation's televoting results were released shortly after the grand final.

Points awarded to Norway

Points awarded by Norway

Detailed voting results
The following members comprised the Norwegian jury:
  (jury chairperson)musician, music producer, songwriter
 Finn-Ulrik Berntsenmusic producer
 artist
 Kamilla Wigestrandartist, songwriter
 Maiken Krokenmusician, singer, vocal coach

Notes and references

Notes

References

External links

Full national final on nrk.no

2019
Countries in the Eurovision Song Contest 2019
2019
Eurovision
Eurovision